Martim Aguiar is a Portuguese rugby union coach and a former player. He played for Grupo Desportivo Direito, where he was also a coach. Aguiar became head coach of the Portugal national team on 13 September 2016 and signed a three-year contract. During his coaching tenure, Portugal participated in qualification for the 2019 Rugby World Cup, but failed to qualify. Also during his tenure, Portugal won the twice the 2017-18 Rugby Europe Trophy and the 2018–19 Rugby Europe Trophy, both with a grand slam, and also the one-game playoff match against Germany (37-32), for a place in the 2020 Rugby Europe Championship. He was replaced shortly after by French coach Patrice Lagisquet.

References

External links
Martim Aguiar é o novo seleccionador nacional de râguebi, Público, 13 September 2016 (Portuguese)

Living people
Portuguese rugby union players
Portuguese rugby union coaches
Year of birth missing (living people)